This is a list of by-elections for the House of Representatives from its creation in 1901 until the present day.

Casual vacancies in the House of Representatives arise when a member dies, is disqualified or resigns, or for some other reason the seat becomes vacant. Members normally resign by tendering resignation to the Speaker of the House of Representatives.

Casual vacancies are filled by by-elections. The Speaker has a discretion as to when to call a by-election and may not call one at all, for example, if a general election is imminent. At least 33 days must elapse between the issue by the Speaker of a writ and the date of a by-election, and the Speaker cannot issue the writ until receipt of a formal letter of resignation. A by-election must take place on a Saturday.


List of by-elections
In the following table, gains for the Australian Labor Party are highlighted in red, for the Liberal Party of Australia and its predecessors (including the Protectionist Party) in blue, for the National Party of Australia and its predecessors as well as the unrelated Australian Greens in green, and for others in grey.

Brackets around a date indicate that the candidate was unopposed when nominations closed. These candidates were declared "elected unopposed" with effect from the date of the closing of nominations, as there was no need to hold a by-election.

Notes

See also
 Chronology of Australian federal parliaments

 
Australia, federal by-elections